Runyan is a surname. People with the surname include:

Damon Runyon (born Alfred Damon Runyan; 1880–1946), American newspaperman and writer
Jon Runyan (born 1973), American politician
Jon Runyan Jr. (born 1997), American football player & son of Jon
Marla Runyan (born 1969), American athlete and runner
Pablo Runyan (1925–2002), Panamanian painter
Paul Runyan (1908–2002), American golfer
Rachael Runyan (1979–1982), American murder victim
Sean Runyan (born 1974), American baseball player
Tygh Runyan (born 1976), American/Canadian actor and musician

See also
Runyon (disambiguation)